This is a list of politicians from Bihar, India. It includes leaders from different political parties.

References

 
Bihar-related lists
Bihar